Marian Rose White is a 1982 American television film directed by Robert Day, written by Garry Rusoff and starring Nancy Cartwright in one of her earliest performances. The film was nominated for the Primetime Emmy Award for Outstanding Sound Editing for a Miniseries, Movie or a Special.

Notable cast members
 Nancy Cartwright
 Charles Aidman
 Ruth Silveira
 Louis Giambalvo
 Valerie Perrine
 Katharine Ross
 Frances Lee McCain
 John Davey
 John Considine
 Anne Ramsey
 Ricky Wittman

External links 
 
 TV: 'Marian Rose White' in a Mental Institution (NY Times Review,  1982)

1980s English-language films
1982 television films
1982 films
Sterilization in fiction
1982 drama films
Films scored by Billy Goldenberg
American drama television films
1980s American films